The second season of the Radiant anime television series is animated by Lerche. It is based on the manfra series of the same name written and illustrated by Tony Valente. In the season finale, a 21-episode second season was announced. It premiered on October 2, 2019. The opening theme is "Naraku" by Halo at Yojohan, while the ending theme is "Chitto mo Shiranakatta" by Emi Nakamura.


Episode list

Notes

References

Radiant episode lists
2019 Japanese television seasons
2020 Japanese television seasons